Vellilappally  is a village in Kottayam district in the state of Kerala, India.

Demographics
As of the 2001 India census, Vellilappally had a population of 17,090 with 8,477 males and 8,613 females.

References

Villages in Kottayam district